Donald Neil Spring (born June 15, 1959) is a Venezuelan-born Canadian former ice hockey defenceman. 

Spring was born in Maracaibo, Venezuela and raised in Edson, Alberta.

Spring was a 2 time national champion with the University of Alberta Golden Bears hockey team. Spring represented Canada at the 1980 Winter Olympics held in Lake Placid, where he scored one assist in six games.

Spring started his National Hockey League career with the Winnipeg Jets in 1980. He would play his entire career with the Jets. He would leave the NHL after the 1984 season. Spring still holds the record for the most career games in the NHL (259) by a player with only one career goal.

He finished his hockey career with one season with EHC Essen-West in West Germany. Presently he is president of Spring Fuel Distributors Inc. in Kelowna, B.C.

Career statistics

Regular season and playoffs

International

References

External links 
 

1959 births
Living people
Alberta Golden Bears ice hockey players
Canadian ice hockey defencemen
Essen Mosquitoes players
Ice hockey people from Alberta
Ice hockey players at the 1980 Winter Olympics
Olympic ice hockey players of Canada
People from Edson, Alberta
Sportspeople from Maracaibo
Sherbrooke Jets players
Undrafted National Hockey League players
Winnipeg Jets (1979–1996) players